Princess Mondha Nobharatana (5 May 1858 – 2 June 1861) was a Princess of Siam (later Thailand). She was a member of the Siamese royal family and was a daughter of King Mongkut of Siam and Chao Chom Manda Mod Indravimala.

Her mother was The Noble Consort (Chao Chom Manda) Mod (a daughter of In Indravimala). She was given her full name by her father - Phra Borom Wong Ther Phra Ong Chao Mondha Nobharatana. She had one younger brother, Prince Chandradat Chudadhan.

Princess Mondha Nobharatana died on 2 June 1861, aged 3.

References 

19th-century Thai women
19th-century Chakri dynasty
1858 births
1861 deaths
Thai female Phra Ong Chao
Children of Mongkut
People from Bangkok
Daughters of kings